Tomtefamiljen i Storskogen ("The Santa Claus Family in the Big Forest") was the Sveriges Television's Christmas calendar and Sveriges Radio's Christmas Calendar in 1962.

Plot 
A tomte family travels across Sweden by helicopter collecting wish lists from the children.

References

External links 
 

1962 radio programme debuts
1962 radio programme endings
1962 Swedish television series debuts
1962 Swedish television series endings
Sveriges Radio's Christmas Calendar
Sveriges Television's Christmas calendar
Television shows set in Sweden